Jeong Jeong-eun (born 18 July 1945) is a South Korean volleyball player. She competed in the women's tournament at the 1964 Summer Olympics.

References

1945 births
Living people
South Korean women's volleyball players
Olympic volleyball players of South Korea
Volleyball players at the 1964 Summer Olympics
Place of birth missing (living people)